Ərdəşəvi is a village in the Lachin District of Azerbaijan.

History 
The village was located in the Armenian-occupied territories surrounding Nagorno-Karabakh, coming under the control of ethnic Armenian forces during the First Nagorno-Karabakh War in the early 1990s. The village subsequently became part of the breakaway Republic of Artsakh as part of its Kashatagh Province, referred to as Artashavi. It was returned to Azerbaijan as part of the 2020 Nagorno-Karabakh ceasefire agreement.

Historical heritage sites 
Historical heritage sites in and around the village include the historical village of Malkhalap (also Malkhalaf) with a ruined medieval bridge nearby, a stele from 1221, a 13th-century khachkar, a khachkar from 1481, a tombstone from 1575, and two 17th-century khachkars.

Demographics 
The village had 88 inhabitants in 2005, and 127 inhabitants in 2015.

Gallery

References

External links 
 

Villages in Azerbaijan
Populated places in Lachin District